Anthony McDonald may refer to:

Anthony McDonald (Australian footballer) (born 1972), Australian rules footballer (Melbourne FC)
Anthony McDonald (Scottish footballer) (born 2001), Scottish footballer (Heart of Midlothian FC)
Anthony McDonald-Tipungwuti (born 1993), Australian rules footballer (Essendon FC)